Baviácora is a small town and the municipal seat of the surrounding municipality of the Mexican state of Sonora.

Location and Boundaries
The municipality is located almost in the center of the state at a distance of 125 kilometers from the state capital, Hermosillo, in the valley of the Río Sonora. In the north is the municipality of Aconchi, in the south the municipalities of Ures and Villa Pesqueira, in the east the municipality of Cumpas and in the west the municipalities of Ures and Rayón. The town is situated at an elevation of 620 meters above sea level.

Area and Population
The area of the municipality is 858.96 km².  The population in 2005 was 3,404 with (3,724 in 2000) with 1,974 residing in the municipal seat (2000 INEGI).

Climate
The climate is hot and dry.  From June to September the average high is 30.1° while from December to January the average minimum is 13.5°C.  The annual average temperature is 22.7°C.

Education and Health Care
There are only primary and middle schools. Students need to travel to Hermosillo or Ures for a secondary- school education.  There is no hospital. Healthcare is provided by public clinics, which provide only non-specialized care.

Economic Activity
The economy is highly dependent on agriculture and cattle raising. The main crops are corn and beans. Grasses are grown for cattle fodder.  The cattle herd numbered over 17,000 head in 2000. 

There are micro-industries and one assembly plant (maquiladora), which manufactures clothing.

Tourist attractions
The main tourist attraction is the mission church of Nuestra Señora de la Concepción de Banácora.

History
In 1639 the Portuguese Jesuit missionary Bartolomé Castaños established the mission of Nuestra Señora de la Concepción de Baviácora. The name Baviácora is a transliteration of the Opata word "babícori," the mint that grows along the Río Sonora.  Before this, in 1639, the Opata had been conquered by the Spanish general Pedro de Perea. Baviácora became a municipality in 1931.

Sources consulted
Enciclopedia de los Municipios de Mexico
INEGI

External links

Baviácora, Ayuntamiento Digital (Official Website of Baviácora, Sonora)
A good photo of the town
Hands Across the Border article on the town English. Translated from the official Internet site of the state of Sonora, Mexico.

Populated places in Sonora